Kaonar P.K. Saenchai Muaythaigym (born May 20, 1990) is a Thai Muay Thai fighter, originally from Nakhon Si Thammarat in the South of Thailand.

Titles and accomplishments
 Phoenix Fighting Championship
 2018 Phoenix FC 130lbs Champion
 Lumpinee Stadium
 2007 Lumpinee Stadium 108 lbs Champion

Fight record

|-  style="background:#;"
| 2023-03-11 ||  ||align=left| Sot Kevin || Suek Muay Thai Yuen Tin|| Surat Thani, Thailand || || ||
|-  style="background:#cfc;"
| 2023-02-04 || Win ||align=left| Long Samnang || LWC Super Champ, Lumpinee Stadium || Bangkok, Thailand || Decision|| 3||3:00
|-  style="background:#cfc;"
| 2022-06-29 ||Win ||align=left| Yodlekpet Or.Atchariya || Muaythai Palangmai, Rajadamnern Stadium || Bangkok, Thailand || Decision|| 5||3:00 
|-  style="background:#cfc;"
| 2022-04-16|| Win ||align=left| Yodlekpet Or.Atchariya || Pitaktham + Sor.Sommai|| Phayao province, Thailand || Referee stoppage||4  || 
|-  style="background:#c5d2ea;"
| 2022-03-11||Draw ||align=left| Yodlekpet Or.Atchariya || Pitaktham + Sor.Sommai + Palangmai || Songkhla province, Thailand || Decision || 5 || 3:00 
|-  style="background:#cfc;"
| 2021-12-30||Win ||align=left| Yodlekpet Or.Atchariya  || Muay Thai SAT Super Fight WiteetinThai || Phuket, Thailand ||  Decision || 5 || 3:00 
|-  style="background:#fbb;"
| 2021-11-26|| Loss ||align=left| Rangkhao Wor.Sangprapai || Muaymanwansuk, Rangsit Stadium || Rangsit, Thailand || Decision || 5 || 3:00 
|-  style="background:#fbb;"
| 2021-04-08|| Loss ||align=left| Thaksinlek DN.MuayThaiGym || SuekMahakamMuayRuamPonKon Chana + Petchyindee|| Songkhla province, Thailand || Decision || 5 || 3:00
|-  style="background:#fbb;"
| 2020-11-07|| Loss ||align=left| Superball Tded99 ||  SAT HERO SERIES, World Siam Stadium || Bangkok, Thailand || Decision ||5 ||3:00
|-  style="background:#fbb;"
| 2020-10-05|| Loss ||align=left| Rodtang Jitmuangnon ||  R1 UFA, World Siam Stadium || Bangkok, Thailand || Decision ||5 ||3:00
|-  style="background:#cfc;"
| 2020-09-13|| Win ||align=left| Henry Lee || Muay Thai Super Champ || Bangkok, Thailand || Decision || 3 || 3:00
|-  style="background:#cfc;"
| 2020-07-15|| Win ||align=left| Yodlekpet Or. Pitisak || Rajadamnern Stadium || Bangkok, Thailand || Decision || 5 || 3:00
|-  style="background:#cfc;"
| 2020-02-27|| Win||align=left| Rodtang Jitmuangnon || Rajadamnern Stadium || Bangkok, Thailand || Decision || 5|| 3:00
|-  style="background:#cfc;"
| 2019-12-08||Win||align=left| Phlaychumphon Sor. Srisomphong || BOM 2-6～THE Battle Of Muaythai SEASON II vol.6 || Tokyo, Japan || Decision (Unanimous) || 5 || 3:00
|-  style="background:#cfc;"
| 2019-11-07|| Win ||align=left| Saeksan Or. Kwanmuang|| Ruamponkon Prachin ||Prachinburi, Thailand|| Decision || 5 || 3:00
|-  style="background:#c5d2ea;"
| 2019-10-05||Draw||align=left| Superlek Kiatmuu9 || Yod Muay Thai Naikhanomton || Buriram, Thailand || Decision|| 5 || 3:00
|- style="background:#fbb;"
| 2019-08-16|| Loss ||align=left| Panpayak Jitmuangnon || Supit + Sor. Sommai Birthday Fights || Songkla, Thailand || Decision || 5 || 3:00
|- style="background:#fbb;"
| 2019-05-29|| Loss || style="text-align:left;"| Saeksan Or. Kwanmuang || Rajadamnern Stadium || Bangkok, Thailand|| Decision || 5 || 3:00
|-
! style=background:white colspan=9 |
|- style="background:#cfc;"
| 2019-04-25|| Win ||align=left| Superball Tded99 || Rajadamnern Stadium || Bangkok, Thailand || Decision || 5 || 3:00
|- style="background:#cfc;"
| 2018-12-26|| Win ||align=left| Superlek Kiatmuu9 || Rajadamnern Stadium || Bangkok, Thailand || Decision || 5 || 3:00
|- style="background:#cfc;"
| 2018-12-09|| Win ||align=left| Nobu Bravely || BOMXX - The Battle Of MuayThai 20- || Yokohama, Japan || TKO (Referee Stoppage) || 2 ||
|- style="background:#cfc;"
| 2018-11-07|| Win ||align=left| Superball Tded99 || Rajadamnern Stadium || Bangkok, Thailand || Decision || 5 || 3:00
|- style="background:#cfc;"
| 2018-09-27 || Win ||align=left| Saeksan Or. Kwanmuang || Rajadamnern Stadium || Bangkok, Thailand || Decision || 5 || 3:00
|-
|- style="background:#cfc;"
| 2018-07-25 || Win ||align=left| Saeksan Or. Kwanmuang || Rajadamnern Stadium || Bangkok, Thailand || Decision || 5 || 3:00
|-
|-  style="background:#c5d2ea;"
| 2018-06-28 || Draw ||align=left| Saeksan Or. Kwanmuang || Rajadamnern Stadium || Bangkok, Thailand || Decision || 5 || 3:00
|-
|- style="background:#cfc;"
| 2018-04-28|| Win ||align=left| Phetwason Or.Daokrajai || Phoenix 7 Phuket|| Phuket, Thailand || Decision || 5 || 3:00 
|-
! style=background:white colspan=9 |
|- style="background:#cfc;"
| 2018-02-26|| Win ||align=left| Superbank Mor Ratanabandit || Phoenix 5 Bangkok || Bangkok, Thailand || Decision || 5 || 3:00
|- style="background:#fbb;"
| 2018-01-25|| Loss ||align=left| Phetwason Or.Daokrajai || Rajadamnern Stadium || Bangkok, Thailand || Decision || 5 || 3:00
|- style="background:#fbb;"
| 2017-12-21|| Loss ||align=left|  Phet Utong Or. Kwanmuang || Rajadamnern Stadium || Bangkok, Thailand || Decision || 5 || 3:00
|-
! style=background:white colspan=9 |
|- style="background:#fbb;"
| 2017-11-13|| Loss ||align=left|  Mongkolkaew Sor.Sommai || Rajadamnern Stadium || Bangkok, Thailand || Decision || 5 || 3:00
|- style="background:#cfc;"
| 2017-09-11|| Win ||align=left| Superbank Mor Ratanabandit || Rajadamnern Stadium || Bangkok, Thailand || Decision || 5 || 3:00
|-  style="background:#c5d2ea;"
| 2017-07-27|| Draw ||align=left| Superbank Mor Ratanabandit || Rajadamnern Stadium || Bangkok, Thailand || Decision || 5 || 3:00
|- style="background:#cfc;"
| 2017-06-28|| Win ||align=left| Phet Utong Or. Kwanmuang || Rajadamnern Stadium || Bangkok, Thailand || Decision || 5 || 3:00
|- style="background:#fbb;"
| 2016-11-15|| Loss ||align=left| Panpayak Jitmuangnon || Rajadamnern Stadium || Bangkok, Thailand || Decision || 5 || 3:00
|- style="background:#cfc;"
| 2016-10-04 || Win ||align=left| Nuenglanlek Jitmuangnon || Lumpinee Stadium || Bangkok, Thailand || Decision || 5 || 3:00
|-  style="background:#fbb;"
|- style="background:#cfc;"
| 2016-07-21|| Win ||align=left| Tuan Kor.Kumpanart || Rajadamnern Stadium || Bangkok, Thailand || Decision || 5 || 3:00
|- style="background:#fbb;"
| 2016-06-09|| Loss ||align=left| Panpayak Jitmuangnon  || Onesongchai Fights, Rajadamnern Stadium || Bangkok, Thailand || Decision || 5 || 3:00
|- style="background:#fbb;"
| 2016-03-04|| Loss ||align=left| Panpayak Jitmuangnon  || Kriekkrai Fights, Lumpinee Stadium || Bangkok, Thailand || Decision || 5 || 3:00
|-
! style=background:white colspan=9 |
|- style="background:#cfc;"
| 2016-02-12|| Win ||align=left| Jamesak Sakburiram || Lumpinee Stadium || Bangkok, Thailand || TKO || 3 ||
|- style="background:#fbb;"
| 2015-12-22|| Loss ||align=left| Panpayak Jitmuangnon  || Kiatphet Fights, Lumpinee Stadium || Bangkok, Thailand || Decision || 5 || 3:00
|-
! style=background:white colspan=9 |
|- style="background:#cfc;"
| 2015-11-10|| Win ||align=left| Saen Parunchai || Lumpinee Stadium || Bangkok, Thailand || Decision || 5 || 3:00
|- style="background:#cfc;"
| 2015-08-11 || Win ||align=left| Superlek Kiatmuu9  || Lumpinee Stadium  || Bangkok, Thailand || Decision || 5 || 3:00
|- style="background:#cfc;"
| 2015-07-02 || Win ||align=left| Phetmorakot Teeded99  || Rajadamnern Stadium  || Bangkok, Thailand || Decision || 5 || 3:00
|- style="background:#fbb;"
| 2015-04-29 || Loss ||align=left| Yuthakan Phet-Por.Tor.Or || Rajadamnern Stadium  || Bangkok, Thailand || Decision || 5 || 3:00
|- style="background:#fbb;"
| 2015-03-07 || Loss ||align=left| Panpayak Sitjatik || Siam Omnoi Boxing Stadium  || Thailand || Decision || 5 || 3:00
|- style="background:#cfc;"
| 2015-01-24 || Win ||align=left| Kaewkangwan Sitlekphet || Siam Omnoi Boxing Stadium  || Thailand || Decision || 5 || 3:00
|- style="background:#cfc;"
| 2014-11-08 || Win ||align=left| Denkongkae JSP || Channel 7 Boxing Stadium  || Thailand || KO || 2 ||
|- style="background:#fbb;"
| 2014-09-20 || Loss ||align=left| Panpayak Sitjatik || Siam Omnoi Boxing Stadium  || Thailand || KO || 3 ||
|- style="background:#cfc;"
| 2014-07-16 || Win ||align=left| Songkom Srisuriyanyotin || Rajadamnern Stadium  || Bangkok, Thailand || Decision || 5 || 3:00
|-  style="background:#c5d2ea;"
| 2014-02-07 || Draw ||align=left| Fonluang Sitboonmee || Lumpinee Stadium  || Bangkok, Thailand || Decision || 5 || 3:00
|- style="background:#fbb;"
| 2014-01-07 || Loss ||align=left| Sam-A Gaiyanghadao || Lumpinee Stadium  || Bangkok, Thailand || Decision || 5 || 3:00
|- style="background:#cfc;"
| 2013-10-08 || Win ||align=left| Wisanupon Sujeebameekeow || Lumpinee Stadium || Bangkok, Thailand || Decision || 5|| 3:00
|-  style="background:#fbb;"
| 2013-08-15 || Loss ||align=left|  Phet Utong Or. Kwanmuang || Lumpinee Stadium || Bangkok, Thailand || Decision || 5|| 3:00
|-  style="background:#fbb;"
| 2013-07-12 || Loss ||align=left|  Phet Utong Or. Kwanmuang || Lumpinee Stadium || Bangkok, Thailand || Decision || 5|| 3:00
|- style="background:#fbb;"
| 2013-05-17 || Loss ||align=left| Phet Utong Or. Kwanmuang || Lumpinee Stadium || Bangkok, Thailand || Decision || 5|| 3:00
|- style="background:#cfc;"
| 2013-03-15 || Win||align=left| Palangtip Nor Sripung || Lumpinee Stadium || Bangkok, Thailand || Decision || 5|| 3:00
|-  style="background:#fbb;"
| 2013-02-07|| Loss ||align=left| Tingtong Chor KoiyuhaIsuzu || Lumpinee Stadium || Bangkok, Thailand || Decision || 5 || 3:00
|-  style="background:#fbb;"
| 2012-12-07|| Loss ||align=left| Tingtong Chor KoiyuhaIsuzu || Lumpinee Stadium || Bangkok, Thailand || Decision || 5 || 3:00  
|-
! style=background:white colspan=9 |
|-  style="background:#fbb;"
| 2012-11-09|| Loss ||align=left| Superbank Mor Ratanabandit || Lumpinee Stadium || Bangkok, Thailand || KO || 1 ||
|-  style="background:#fbb;"
| 2012-09-12|| Loss ||align=left| Pettawee Sor Kittichai || Rajadamnern Stadium || Bangkok, Thailand || KO || 5 ||
|- style="background:#cfc;"
| 2012-07-20|| Win ||align=left| Luknimit Singklongsi|| Rajadamnern Stadium || Bangkok, Thailand || KO || 3 ||
|-  style="background:#fbb;"
| 2012-06-06|| Loss ||align=left| Superbank Mor Ratanabandit || Rajadamnern Stadium || Bangkok, Thailand || Decision || 5 || 3:00
|-  style="background:#cfc;"
| 2012-04-30|| Win||align=left| Yodtongthai Por.Telakun || Rajadamnern Stadium || Bangkok, Thailand || Decision || 5 || 3:00
|-  style="background:#cfc;"
| 2012-02-28|| Win||align=left| Pornsawan Lookprabath || Lumpinee Stadium || Bangkok, Thailand || Decision || 5 || 3:00
|-  style="background:#cfc;"
| 2012-01-27|| Win||align=left| Yodtongthai Por.Telakun || Lumpinee Stadium || Bangkok, Thailand || Decision || 5 || 3:00
|-  style="background:#c5d2ea;"
| 2011-12-03|| Draw||align=left| Wuttichai Saksubin || Lumpinee Stadium || Bangkok, Thailand || Decision || 5 || 3:00
|-  style="background:#fbb;"
| 2011-10-28 || Loss ||align=left| Yodwicha Banchamek || Lumpinee Stadium || Bangkok, Thailand || Decision || 5 || 3:00
|-  style="background:#fbb;"
| 2011-08-30 || Loss ||align=left| Kaotam Lookprabaht || Rajadamnern Stadium || Bangkok, Thailand || Decision || 5 || 3:00
|-  style="background:#c5d2ea;"
| 2011-07-07 || Draw||align=left| Kaotam Lookprabaht || Rajadamnern Stadium || Bangkok, Thailand || Decision || 5 || 3:00
|-  style="background:#cfc;"
| 2011-06-03|| Win||align=left| Pornsawan Lookprabath || Lumpinee Stadium || Bangkok, Thailand || Decision || 5 || 3:00
|-  style="background:#CCFFCC;"
| 2011-04-29 || Win ||align=left| Petpanomrung Kiatmuu9 || Phetsupaphan Fights, Lumpinee Stadium || Bangkok, Thailand || Decision || 5 || 3:00
|-  style="background:#CCFFCC;"
| 2011-03-15 || Win ||align=left| Chatchainoi Sitbenjama|| Phetsupaphan Fights, Lumpinee Stadium || Bangkok, Thailand || Decision || 5 || 3:00
|-  style="background:#CCFFCC;"
| 2011-01-22 || Win ||align=left| Wanchai Kiatphukam || Siam Omnoi Stadium ||  Thailand || Decision || 5 || 3:00
|-  style="background:#FFBBBB;"
| 2010-03-02 || Loss ||align=left| Luknimit Singklongsi|| Lumpinee Stadium || Bangkok, Thailand || Decision || 5 || 3:00
|-  style="background:#FFBBBB;"
| 2010-01-30 || Loss ||align=left| Denchiangkwan Lamtongkarnpat  || Siam Omnoi Boxing Stadium || Samut Sakhon, Thailand || Decision || 5 || 3:00
|-  style="background:#FFBBBB;"
| 2009-08-11 || Loss ||align=left| Kaotam Lookprabaht || Lumpinee Stadium || Bangkok, Thailand || Decision || 5 || 3:00

|-  style="background:#fbb;"
| 2009-05-01|| Loss||align=left| Saeksan Or. Kwanmuang ||Lumpinee Stadium || Bangkok, Thailand || Decision || 5 || 3:00
|-  style="background:#FFBBBB;"
| 2009-04-03 || Loss ||align=left| Rungpet Wor.Sanprapai || Lumpinee Stadium || Bangkok, Thailand || Decision || 5 || 3:00

|-  style="background:#FFBBBB;"
| 2008-09-19 || Loss ||align=left| Panomroonglek Kiatmuu9 || Lumpinee Stadium || Bangkok, Thailand || Decision || 5 || 3:00
|-  style="background:#FFBBBB;"
| 2008-02-29 || Loss ||align=left| Rungpet Wor.Sanprapai || Lumpinee Stadium || Bangkok, Thailand || Decision || 5 || 3:00
|-
! style=background:white colspan=9 |
|-  style="background:#cfc;"
| 2007-06-08 || Win||align=left| Silarit Sor.Suradej || Lumpinee Stadium || Bangkok, Thailand || Decision || 5 || 3:00
|-
! style=background:white colspan=9 |
|-
| colspan=9 | Legend:

References

Kaonar P.K. Saenchai Muaythaigym
Living people
1990 births
Kaonar P.K. Saenchai Muaythaigym